Point No Point Light may refer to:
Point No Point Light (Maryland) in the Chesapeake Bay
Point No Point Light (Washington) in Puget Sound

See also
Point No Point